Franco-Russian War may refer to several wars between France and Russia:

 War of the Polish Succession (1733–1735)
 War of the Austrian Succession (1748)
 French Revolutionary and Napoleonic wars:
 War of the Second Coalition (1798–1802)
 War of the Third Coalition (1805)
 War of the Fourth Coalition (1806–1807)
 Napoleon's invasion of Russia (1812)
 War of the Sixth Coalition (1813–1814)
 Crimean War (1854–1856)

See also
 Franco-Prussian War